is a Japanese actor.

He debuted when he was 13 months old. He became recognized after his breakthrough role as Higuchi Yoroku (childhood name of Naoe Kanetsugu, as well as Kanetsugu's first son, Takematsu) in Tenchijin the 2009 edition of NHK Taiga Drama. Currently, he is actively appearing in many TV dramas, films, and TV commercials. He will also release a music CD titled  on September 2, 2009.

Filmography

Films 
  (2005)
  (2009)
 Zatoichi (2010)
 You are Umasou (film) (2010)
 Ninja Kids!!! (2011) (Rantarō)
 Assassination Classroom: Graduation (2016) as Itona Horibe
 Hakubo (2019) as Yūsuke (voice)
 #HandballStrive (2020)
 The Sun Stands Still (2021) as Yūji Yanagi

Japanese dubbing of non-Japanese films 
 Happy Feet - as Mumble (childhood)
 The Legend - as Ajik
 Where the Wild Things Are - as Max

TV dramas 
 final episode (2003 NTV) - as Mini Mittan
 4th, 5th, & 10th episodes (2003, TBS) - as Yūya Doigaki
 3rd & 8th episode (2004, TBS) - as Yūichi Yamane
 (2005, TV Tokyo)
 (2005, NHK General) - as Daichi Ōtsuki
 24th episode (September 16, 2006 CBC)
 (April 7, 2007 NTV)
 (2007, NTV) - as Ryōya Kizaki
 9th, 11th, 13th, 15th, and 17th episodes (2007 NHK General, Taiga Drama - as Takeda Tarō (childhood name of Takeda Yoshinobu)
 (January 5, 2008, NHK General) - as Kenta Sayama
 (2008, NTV) - as Makoto Nakamura
 (2008 TBS) - as Manabu
 (July 6, 2008, BS-i) - as Takeshi Toyama
 7th episode (2008, TBS) - as Hiroshi Koizumi
 (October 7, 2008 Fuji TV) - as Atsushi Irie
 (2008, NTV) - as Nozomu Yasuno
 (2009 NHK Taiga Drama) - 1st & 2nd episodes as Higuchi Yoroku, 23rd episode as Naoe Takematsu
 1st and final episodes (January 12 and March 23, 2009 Fuji TV) - as childhood Daiki Kaji
 1st, 7th and final episodes (January 16, March 6 and 13, 2009 TV Asahi) - as Yōshichi
 4th episode (February 28, 2009, BS-i) - as Kōhei Yokoyama
 (2009 Fuji TV) - as Ryōta Hatori
 (2010, TBS) - as Nakahara Takeru
 (2011, TV Asahi)
 (2012, NHK)
 Kirin ga Kuru (2020, NHK) - as Prince Sanehito

Theatre 
 Les Misérables - Gavroche (2011-2013)
 Elisabeth - Young Rudolf (2012)
 Madama Butterfly - Dolore (2014)
 Love Never Dies - Gustave (2014)
 Newsies - Davey Jacobs (2020)

References

External links

 Official profile at EMI Music Japan 
 Yamakoshi, Noriko and Robert Michael Poole. "Seishiro Kato: Popular, charming, talented, successful ... and nine years old." CNN Go. January 7, 2011.

2001 births
21st-century Japanese male actors
Japanese male child actors
Japanese male television actors
Living people
Male actors from Kanagawa Prefecture